Béatrice Roullaud (born June 9, 1960) is a French lawyer and politician for the National Rally who was elected as a Member of the National Assembly for Seine-et-Marne's 6th constituency in 2022.

Roullaud was born in 1960 and studied a law degree. She began working as a solicitor at a notary public office before becoming a lawyer of the bar of Meaux. She was initially a supporter and member of the Movement for France and campaigned for Philippe de Villiers before joining the National Front in 2011.

She was elected as a regional councilor for the National Rally in 2021 in Île-de-France. For the 2022 French legislative election, she contested Seine-et-Marne's 6th constituency and defeated Valérie Delage of La France insoumise in the second round to take the seat.

References 

1960 births
Living people
 National Rally (France) politicians
Deputies of the 16th National Assembly of the French Fifth Republic
Women members of the National Assembly (France)
21st-century French women politicians
French women lawyers
20th-century French lawyers
21st-century French lawyers
People from Meaux